This is a list of railway stations in North Yorkshire, with estimated usage figures gathered from data collected by the Office of Rail and Road (ORR). As of May 2020, there are 58 stations located within the county of North Yorkshire, from which around 21.27 million passenger journeys were made during 2018–19.

Gallery

References

See also
 List of busiest railway stations in Great Britain

Busiest railway stations in North Yorkshire